The Primera División de Nicaragua is the top division of football in Nicaragua. This list shows the champions and movements in and out of the Primera División for each season since its foundation in 1933.

Seasons